"Psycho" is a song by Irish rockabilly singer Imelda May. Written solely by May, the song was released as her third single on June 28, 2010, and the lead single from her third studio album, Mayhem. The single was May's first release on her new record label, Decca.

Origin and recording
The song was written after the release of May's second studio album, Love Tattoo, which she was promoting on tour at the time of writing. The song was recorded during the Mayhem sessions at Embassy Studios, a sixteen track analogue recording studio in a converted cow shed, near Basingstoke, United Kingdom. A remastered version of the song was released as a bonus track on the iTunes version of Mayhem.

Release and promotion
"Psycho" was announced for release in May 2010 at which time the recording and production was completed. In the official press release by Decca Records, it was noted that "'Psycho' sees Imelda displaying some of her more disparate influences, as if PJ Harvey's "Sheela Na Gig" had been recorded in the Ace cafe in North London in front of a load of rockers."

May's following tour of the United States with Jeff Beck promoted the song abroad and in Ireland and the United Kingdom, the song was performed on The Late Late Show on September 10 and Later... with Jools Holland on October 12, respectively.

Though well-promoted in comparison to her previous singles, the single failed chart in neither Ireland nor the United Kingdom.

Music video
Filmed on a higher budget than her only previous music video, "Johnny Got a Boom Boom", the promotional music video for "Psycho" is aptly set in a mental institution and features May as a nurse delivering patients with medication. The video also features The Imelda May Band performing in a solitary confinement room.

Musicians and personnel
The Imelda May Band
Imelda May - vocals, bodhrán
Darrel Higham - guitars
Al Gare - bass, double bass
Stevew Rushton - drums, percussion
Dave Priseman - trumpet, flugel, percussion

Technical personnel
Imelda May - producer, mixing
Andy Wright - producer, mixing
Gavin Goldberg - producer, mixing
Graham Dominy - engineer
Darrel Highham - mixing
Guy Davie - mastering

Track listing
All songs written by Imelda May.

Digital download
"Psycho" - 2:54
"My Baby Left Me" - 2:57
"Sneaky Freak" - 3:10
"Psycho" (video) - 2:44

Limited edition 7" vinyl
"Psycho" - 2:54
"My Baby Left Me" - 2:57

External links

References

2010 singles
Rockabilly songs
Imelda May songs
Songs written by Imelda May
2010 songs
Decca Records singles